Ionuț Tătaru (born 5 October 1989) is a Romanian footballer who plays as a centre back for Jiul Rovinari.

References

External links
 
 

1989 births
People from Gorj County
Living people
Romanian footballers
Association football defenders
Liga I players  
Liga II players
CS Minerul Lupeni players
CS Pandurii Târgu Jiu players
CS Turnu Severin players
SCM Râmnicu Vâlcea players
CS Sportul Snagov players
FC Olimpia Satu Mare players
LPS HD Clinceni players
CSM Deva players